Preston Lodge Former Pupil Rugby Football Club is a rugby union club based in Prestonpans in East Lothian, Scotland. Formed in 1929, they currently play in Scottish National League Division Two.

History

The club formed in 1929–30 with Dr. Boyle as its first president and originates from the roots of Preston Lodge High School, formed in 1924. This connection is still going strong today. The club fields teams at every age group Primary 1–7, Secondary 1–3, under-16, under-18. As well as fielding two senior XV's. The Club has formed links over the years with United Pirates – a club in New Zealand and Balmy Beach rugby club in Toronto, Canada. This has allowed for the exchange of players and coaching techniques.

A number of PLRFC players have played age group rugby for Scotland and gaining many caps for their country. The most recent and successful players to do this are Scott Murray and Allan Jacobsen, both played for Edinburgh and Scotland.

Preston Lodge RFC Defeated Dalziel RFC To Win The SHE Bowl At Murrayfield in May 2008.

PL recorded an amazing season in 2013–14, winning the East Regional Division 1 Championship remaining unbeaten throughout the whole league, winning 18 out of 18 games. They are back with a bang in 2021 with a young exuberant squad.

In 2014–15 PL gained promotion for the third season running, finishing 2nd in BT National League Three and gaining automatic promotion to BT National League Two for the 2015–16 season.

Sides

Preston Lodge play at Pennypit Park in Prestonpans and are currently fielding two teams each week.

Preston Lodge Sevens

The club run the Preston Lodge Sevens tournament.

Notable players

 Allan Jacobsen
 Scott Murray

Honours

 Preston Lodge Sevens
 Champions (2): 1988, 1995
Peebles Sevens
 Champions (2): 1981, 1994
Walkerburn Sevens
 Champions (1): 1997
 Ellon Sevens
 Champions (1): 1993
 Penicuik Sevens
 Champions (7): 1965, 1966, 1967, 1968, 1973, 1976, 2015
 Haddington Sevens
 Champions (4): 1963, 1964, 1990, 1996
 Edinburgh District Sevens
 Champions (6): 1961, 1962, 1963, 1964, 1965, 1966
 Musselburgh Sevens
 Champions (1): 1989
 Kirkcaldy Sevens
 Champions (1): 1976
 North Berwick Sevens
 Champions (4): 1961, 1968, 1972, 1974

References

External links
 Preston Lodge RFC

Scottish rugby union teams
Rugby clubs established in 1929
1929 establishments in Scotland
Rugby union in East Lothian
Prestonpans